St. Mary's Monastery Church is a monastery church in Tranoshisht, Gjirokastër County, Albania. It is a Cultural Monument of Albania.

References

Cultural Monuments of Albania
Buildings and structures in Gjirokastër
Churches in Gjirokastër